Diego Živulić (born 23 March 1992) is a Croatian footballer who plays as a defensive midfielder for Romanian club Oțelul Galați.

Career
Živulić started training at his local club Novigrad, before moving on to nearby Jadran Poreč. At the age of 16, he was snapped up by the first-tier club Rijeka. After being voted the best player of the Kvarnerska Rivijera tournament, he was sent on loan to the third-tier side Orijent in 2010, and later to the second-tier club Pomorac. At the same time, he also became a Croatian youth international, amassing 20 caps overall for the Croatia U18 and Croatia U19 teams.

In his first professional season, 2011–12, Živulić collected nine caps for Rijeka. In mid-2012, Rijeka loaned Živulić to Pomorac again, where he would remain until the end of his contract with the club, in 2014. That summer, he moved abroad, to the Czech second-tier club Zlín, with whom he achieved promotion to the Czech First League the following summer.

On 1 August 2019, Živulić joined Polish club Śląsk Wrocław.

Personal life
Živulić studied at the Faculty of Economy at the University of Rijeka.

Career statistics

Club

References

External links
 

1992 births
Living people
Footballers from Rijeka
Association football midfielders
Croatian footballers
Croatia youth international footballers
HNK Rijeka players
HNK Orijent players
NK Pomorac 1921 players
FC Fastav Zlín players
FC Viktoria Plzeň players
Pafos FC players
Śląsk Wrocław players
Diósgyőri VTK players
FK Bregalnica Štip players
NK Tabor Sežana players
ASC Oțelul Galați players
Second Football League (Croatia) players
Croatian Football League players
First Football League (Croatia) players
Czech First League players
Cypriot First Division players
Ekstraklasa players
Nemzeti Bajnokság I players
Macedonian First Football League players
Slovenian PrvaLiga players

Croatian expatriate footballers
Croatian expatriate sportspeople in the Czech Republic
Expatriate footballers in the Czech Republic
Croatian expatriate sportspeople in Cyprus
Expatriate footballers in Cyprus
Croatian expatriate sportspeople in Poland
Expatriate footballers in Poland
Croatian expatriate sportspeople in Hungary
Expatriate footballers in Hungary
Croatian expatriate sportspeople in North Macedonia
Expatriate footballers in North Macedonia
Croatian expatriate sportspeople in Slovenia
Expatriate footballers in Slovenia
Croatian expatriate sportspeople in Romania
Expatriate footballers in Romania